Royal Cinque Ports Golf Club is an 18-hole links golf course in southeastern England, in the town of Deal in the County of Kent (the course is often known simply as "Deal").

Founded  in 1892, its name derives from Deal's membership of an ancient group of trading towns granted special privileges by the medieval English monarchs, known as the Cinque Ports. The  course runs along the coast of Sandwich Bay, on the same stretch of coastline as Royal St George's Golf Club and Prince's Golf Club, adjacent to the north.

Royal Cinque Ports hosted The Open Championship in 1909 and 1920. Two more were scheduled for 1938 and 1949, but both were relocated when abnormally high tides inundated the course; both were held at nearby Royal St George's. Consequently, the club was removed from the Open Championship rota, but remains a final qualifying course (most recently in 2017). It has also continued to host various other tournaments including The Amateur Championship (1923, 1982, 2013) and, since 1925, it has hosted the Public Schools Championship every year.

Karen Stupples, winner of the 2004 Weetabix Women's British Open, is a member of Royal Cinque Ports.

Scorecard
Royal Cinque Ports Golf Club Scorecard, Black Tees

The Open Championship
Royal Cinque Ports Golf Club, Deal has hosted The Open Championship twice.

Note: For multiple winners of The Open Championship, superscript ordinal identifies which in their respective careers.

Notable members
 David Gordon Hines was responsible for the development of co-operatives in Tanganyika and Uganda, improving the living standards of farmers in their transition from subsistence farming to cash crops. In Uganda in the 1950s, his organisation encouraged some 500,000 farmers to join these co-operatives.

See also
List of golf clubs granted Royal status

References

External links
 
 
Golf Club Atlas Guide

Golf clubs and courses in Kent
The Open Championship venues
Deal, Kent
Organisations based in the United Kingdom with royal patronage
Royal golf clubs